Arthur MacKenzie may refer to:

 Arthur R. MacKenzie (1873–1963), Canadian politician in the Legislative Assembly of New Brunswick
 Arthur W. MacKenzie (1898–1986), army officer and political figure in Nova Scotia, Canada
 Arthur Stanley Mackenzie (1865–1938), Canadian physicist and university president
 Arthur John Mackenzie (1871–1949), Scottish chess player

See also
Arthur McKenzie (1879–1916), Australian rules footballer
Arthur McKenzie (cricketer) (1914–1955), Jamaican cricketer